In music, Op. 159 stands for Opus number 159. Compositions that are assigned this number include:

 Saint-Saëns – Hymne à la paix
 Schubert – Fantasy for violin and piano
 Wagner – Under the Double Eagle